Vlachorraptis (also Βλαχορράφτης - Vlachorraftis) is a village in western Arcadia, Greece. It is situated on a hill above the right bank of the river Alfeios, at about 650 m elevation. It is 2 km southeast of Sarakini, 2 km west of Atsicholos, 6 km northwest of Karytaina and 7 km southwest of Stemnitsa. In 2011 Vlachorraptis had a population of 40.

According to the ancient geographer Pausanias the city of Maratha (Μάραθα) was located on the site of the modern village. The modern settlement however was founded in ca. 1600.

Population

Notable people 
Theodore Angelopoulos (b. 1943), businessman

See also
List of settlements in Arcadia

References

External links
History and information about Vlachorraptis
 Vlachorraptis on the GTP Travel Pages

Gortyna, Arcadia
Populated places in Arcadia, Peloponnese